The Tianjin–Pukou or Jinpu railway (Postal spelling: Tientsin-Pukow Railway) runs from Tianjin to Pukou district outside Nanjing in Jiangsu province.

History 
The first proposals to build railways in China began in the 1860s with opposition from the elite, who worried that it would increase the likelihood of regime change. However, following China's loss in the First Sino-Japanese War in 1895, the desire to modernize began to predominate. However, due to technical and financial constraints, foreign support was needed to build the earliest railways. At a conference in London in September 1898, British and German capitalists decided to build a railway from Tianjin to Zhenjiang. In May 1899, the Qing government agreed to the financing of the railway construction along with a series of bank loans. The proposed course for the railway was to connection the political center of China in the north to the economic hub in the southern region, as well as the Yangtze River. Construction of the railway began in 1908 and the line was completed in 1912.  All together, the original railway line was built with 85 stations, of which 31 were in Shandong province.

Rail traffic had to be ferried across the Yangtze to Nanjing to connect with the railroads passing through that city until the Nanjing Yangtze River Bridge was built across the river in 1968. Currently, it is the main section of Beijing–Shanghai railway.

References

See also

Rail transport in the People's Republic of China
List of railways in China

Railway lines in China
Rail transport in Jiangsu
Rail transport in Tianjin